Leochilus is a genus of flowering plants from the orchid family, Orchidaceae, native to Mexico, Central America, northern South America, the West Indies and Florida.

Leochilus carinatus (Knowles & Westc.) Lindl. - Oaxaca, Veracruz
Leochilus crocodiliceps (Rchb.f.) Kraenzl. in H.G.A.Engler - Jalisco, Colima
Leochilus hagsateri M.W.Chase - Oaxaca
Leochilus inconspicuus (Kraenzl.) M.W.Chase & N.H.Williams - Costa Rica
Leochilus johnstonii Ames & Correll - from Oaxaca south to Nicaragua
Leochilus labiatus (Sw.) Kuntze - from Oaxaca south to Brazil; also West Indies and Florida
Leochilus leiboldii Rchb.f.  - Oaxaca, Veracruz
Leochilus leochilinus (Rchb.f.) M.W.Chase & N.H.Williams - Nicaragua, Costa Rica, Panama
Leochilus oncidioides Knowles & Westc. - Mexico, Guatemala, Honduras
Leochilus puertoricensis M.W.Chase - Puerto Rico, St. Lucia
Leochilus scriptus (Scheidw.) Rchb.f. - from southern Mexico south to Ecuador; also Cuba, Trinidad, Dominican Republic
Leochilus tricuspidatus (Rchb.f.) Kraenzl. in H.G.A.Engler  - Costa Rica, Panama

See also 
 List of Orchidaceae genera

References 

  (1838) Floral Cabinet 2: 143.
  2005. Handbuch der Orchideen-Namen. Dictionary of Orchid Names. Dizionario dei nomi delle orchidee. Ulmer, Stuttgart
  (2009). Epidendroideae (Part two). Genera Orchidacearum 5: 283 ff. Oxford University Press.

External links 

Oncidiinae genera
Oncidiinae